Indian Mary Park is part of the Josephine County Parks system in the U.S. state of Oregon. The heavily used park is the county's most popular in summer.

The park was named for Mary Peters, who was known as "Indian Mary".

Amenities include a boat ramp, a public pay telephone, a disc golf course, and three restrooms, including two with showers. Campsites include places for tents and sites with utility hook-ups for travel trailers, as well as two five-person yurts provided with furniture, electricity, lighting, and heat. The park's entrance station has ice, firewood, and other items, and provides information. Registered campers have access to the park's dump station.

Sites may be reserved two days to nine months in advance. The county publishes a fee schedule for various kinds of camping and other uses of the park. Non-campers are generally charged a $2 day-use fee for parking. Annual passes are available, and people entering the park on foot, by bicycle, or on a horse do not have to pay the parking fee.

References

External links
Oregon Parks Association – Josephine County

Parks in Josephine County, Oregon